Alepu is a swamp on the Bulgarian Black Sea coast, situated within Burgas Province, 6.5 kilometers south of the resort town of Sozopol. Since 1986, the area has been designated a nature reserve due to the large variety of rare and protected water birds who live there, and has sustained significant interest from local and foreign ornithologists. The sand dunes adjacent to the reserve have also been designated as protected. Because of the lax protection from the local authorities, illegal hunting and fishing remain a threat to the reserve. It forms part of the Ropotamo Important Bird Area.

The beach across from Alepu is known for its scenic beauty and aquamarine water. Up until the building of the Saint Thomas resort complex in 2009, it was known as one of the few truly wild beaches in Bulgaria.

Alepu Rocks in the South Shetland Islands, Antarctica are named after the Alepu locality.

References

Swamps of Bulgaria
Landforms of Burgas Province
Protected areas of Bulgaria
Bulgarian Black Sea Coast
Important Bird Areas of Bulgaria
Beaches of Bulgaria